Team Associated RC12 is an electric 1/12 scale Radio Control vehicle made by Associated Electrics.  The car was debuted in 1978 and has won many IFMAR world championships and Remotely Operated Auto Racers US national championships.

Versions 
 RC12E - 1978
 RC12i- 1983
 RC12L- 1986
 RC12LW Graphite- 1991
 RC12LS with Dynamic Strut front suspension - 1993
 RC12LC- 1996
 RC12L3- 1998
 RC12L3O- 1999
 RC12L4- 2004
 RC12R5- 2008
 RC12R5.1- 2009
 RC12R5.2 - 2012
 RC12R6 - 2017

References

External links 
 Many vintage RC12 manuals posted online 

RC12